Ángela Patricia Janiot Martirena (born October 2, 1963) is a Colombian-American journalist and news anchor, and former beauty queen and model. She worked for 25 years at CNN en Español as the senior news anchor where she established her career as a reputable figure in Latin American news. Currently, she works as a News Anchor and Senior Correspondent at Noticias Univision.

Miss World
Before becoming a journalist, Janiot was a Colombian model, then she participated as Miss Santander in the Miss Colombia pageant in 1983, where she won the title of Miss Mundo Colombia and was sent to Miss World 1984 pageant. She travelled to London and participated at the pageant, there she placed in the Top 15 semifinalists.

CNN Internacional
After her participation as a beauty queen she graduated with a degree in journalism at Universidad de la Sabana in Bogotá. She joined CNN in 1992, where she hosted the Noticiero Telemundo CNN After the association with Telemundo she stayed with CNN and anchored CNN Internacional. Since CNN en Español was founded in 1997, she became its main news anchor.

Awards
She has received several journalism awards, such as the Golden Mike Award in 1990 and the Simón Bolívar Journalism Award in Colombia. She has also been nominated and awarded the Emmy Award.

Personal life and charitable work 
Janiot was born in 1963 in Bucaramanga, Santander Department to Roberto Pablo Janiot (an Argentine of French descent), a former football player who played for the Atlético Bucaramanga for some years, and his wife Zunilda Elvizzi Martirena also Argentine of Italian descent. She is married to Miguel Yelós San Martín, from Argentina, with whom she has two children, Tábatha and Tadeo, and currently lives in Miami, Florida. Janiot is president of the Colombianitos foundation, which helps children who are victims of the Colombian armed conflict.

See also     

Ana Navarro
Anderson Cooper
Andrés Oppenheimer
Arianna Huffington
Carlos Alberto Montaner
Carlos Montero
Christiane Amanpour
Fareed Zakaria
Fernando del Rincón
Geovanny Vicente
Pedro Bordaberry
Sylvia Garcia
CNN en Español

References

External links
 CNN en Español profile
 Colombianitos
 Personal Blog

1963 births
Living people
People from Bucaramanga
Colombian people of Argentine descent
Colombian people of French descent
Colombian people of Italian descent
Argentine people of French descent
Argentine people of Italian descent
Colombian beauty pageant winners
Miss World 1984 delegates
Colombian television journalists
Colombian women television journalists
Colombian emigrants to the United States
CNN people
American television news anchors
American television reporters and correspondents
American people of Argentine descent
American people of French descent
American people of Italian descent
American women television journalists
University of La Sabana alumni
21st-century American women